Grant Charles Smith is the 29th mayor of Palmerston North, New Zealand. He was first elected to the Palmerston North City Council in 2013, and was elected as mayor in the February 2015 by-election when Jono Naylor resigned. He then won the 2016 election with around 17,500 more votes than his only rival. He was re-elected in 2022. He came from a background of marketing and media, selling his design business when first elected as mayor.

References

External links
 Official biography and contact details at Palmerston North City Council 
 Grant Smith campaign site

Mayors of Palmerston North
Living people
Palmerston North City Councillors
People educated at Palmerston North Boys' High School
Year of birth missing (living people)